Goldmont Plus is a microarchitecture for low-power Atom, Celeron and Pentium Silver branded processors used in systems on a chip (SoCs) made by Intel. The Gemini Lake platform with 14 nm Goldmont Plus core was officially launched on December 11, 2017. Intel launched the Gemini Lake Refresh platform on November 4, 2019.

Design
Goldmont Plus is an enhanced 2nd generation out-of-order low-power Atom microarchitecture designed for entry level desktop and notebook computers. Goldmont Plus is built on the 14 nm manufacturing process and supports up to four cores for the consumer devices. It includes the Intel Gen9 graphics architecture with improvements introduced with the Kaby Lake microarchitecture.

The Goldmont Plus microarchitecture builds on the success of the Goldmont microarchitecture, and provides the following enhancements:

 Widened previous generation Atom processor back-end pipeline to 4-wide allocation to 4-wide retire, while maintaining 3-wide fetch and decode pipeline.
 Enhanced branch prediction unit. 
 64 KB shared second level pre-decode cache (16 KB in Goldmont microarchitecture).
 Larger reservation station and re-order buffer entries to support large out-of-order window. 
 Wider integer execution unit. New dedicated JEU port with support for faster branch redirection.
 Radix-1024 floating point divider for fast scalar/packed single, double and extended precision floating point divides. 
 Improved AES-NI instruction latency and throughput.
 Larger load and store buffers. Improved store-to-load forwarding latency store data from register.
 Shared instruction and data second level TLB. Paging cache enhancements (PxE/ePxE caches). 
 Modular system design with four cores sharing up to 4 MB L2 cache.
 Support for Read Processor ID (RDPID) new instruction.

Technology

 A 14 nm manufacturing process
 System on a chip architecture
 3D tri-gate transistors
 Consumer chips up to four cores
 Supports SSE4.2 instruction set
 Supports Intel AESNI and PCLMUL instructions
 Supports Intel RDRAND and RDSEED instructions
 Supports Intel SHA extensions
 Supports Intel MPX (Memory Protection Extensions)
 Supports Intel SGX
 4 MB L2 cache, up from 2MB in Goldmont
 Updated Gen 9 Intel HD Graphics with DirectX 12, OpenGL 4.6,  OpenGL ES 3.2 and OpenCL 2.0 support. 
 HEVC Main10 & VP9 10-bit Profile2 hardware decoding support
 Integrated native HDMI 2.0 display controller (Goldmont only supported HDMI 1.4 natively)
 10 W thermal design power (TDP) desktop processors
 4.8 to 6.0 W TDP mobile processors
 eMMC 5.1 technology to connect to NAND flash storage
 USB 3.1 and USB-C specification
 Support for DDR4 and LPDDR4 memory
 Supports CNVi

List of Goldmont Plus processors

Desktop processors (Gemini Lake)
List of desktop processors as follows:

Mobile processors (Gemini Lake)
List of mobile processors as follows:

Desktop processors (Gemini Lake Refresh) 
List of desktop processors as follows:

Mobile processors (Gemini Lake Refresh) 
List of mobile processors as follows:

See also
List of Intel CPU microarchitectures
List of Intel Pentium microprocessors
List of Intel Celeron microprocessors
List of Intel Atom microprocessors
Atom (system on chip)

References

Intel x86 microprocessors
Intel microarchitectures
X86 microarchitectures